The thirty world's busiest airports by aircraft movements are measured by total movements (data provided by Airports Council International). A movement is a landing or takeoff of an aircraft and includes both air transport movements and general aviation.

2021 statistics 
Airports Council International's final full-year figures are as follows:

2020 statistics 
Airports Council International's final full-year figures are as follows:

2017 statistics 
Airports Council International's final full-year figures are as follows:

2016 statistics 
Airports Council International's full-year figures are as follows:

2015 statistics 
Airports Council International's full-year figures are as follows:

2014 statistics 
Airports Council International's full-year figures are as follows:

2013 final statistics 

Source:

2012 final statistics 

Source:

2011 final statistics 

Source:

2010 final statistics 

Source:

2009 final statistics

Sources:

2008 final statistics

Source:

2007 final statistics

Source:

2006 final statistics

Source:

2005 final statistics

Source:

See also

List of busiest airports by international passenger traffic
List of busiest airports by passenger traffic
List of busiest airports by cargo traffic

References

External links
 Google sheets list of airport runway counts and movement stats

 Movements